Andrei Bărbulescu (16 October 1909 – 30 July 1987) was a Romanian football midfielder who played for Romania in the 1938 FIFA World Cup.

Honours
FC Juventus București
Liga I (1): 1929–30
Venus București
Liga I (4): 1933–34, 1936–37, 1938–39, 1939–40

References

External links
 
 

1909 births
1987 deaths
Romanian footballers
Romania international footballers
Association football midfielders
FC Petrolul Ploiești players
Venus București players
FC Sportul Studențesc București players
Liga I players
1938 FIFA World Cup players
Sportspeople from Slatina, Romania